The 2011 Blancpain Endurance Series season was the inaugural season of the Blancpain Endurance Series, the sports car racing series developed by the Stéphane Ratel Organisation and the Royal Automobile Club of Belgium (RACB) with approval from the Fédération Internationale de l'Automobile (FIA).

The season commenced on 17 April at Monza and concluded on 9 October at Silverstone.

Calendar
On 15 December 2010, the Stéphane Ratel Organisation announced the 2011 calendar.

Entry list
On 9 March 2011 the SRO released an official entry list of the teams and manufacturers. The full entry list for Monza was released on 10 April.

Results and standings

Race results

References

External links

Blancpain Endurance Series
Blancpain Endurance Series
Blancpain Endurance Series seasons